Asriel was a Japanese metal band composed of Kurose Keisuke (Composer and Representative) and KOKOMI (Vocal and Lyrics). They were an indie group and have released 10 indie albums and 4 commercial singles. They started out releasing their music in the doujin scene, but have since also had their music used for anime and visual novels.

Concept/history

The band members KOKOMI and Kurose Keisuke became acquaintances as members of LMINA Sound Art's (now known an AZE:LC). They formed their own band in May 2006, with the name written "as + real" to form as "Asriel", the origin of the group name, which is also a reference to the Islam angel "Azrael".

Asriel's activities started with participation in Comiket and the Music Media-mix Market (M3) events where they sold dōjinshi music albums. In April 2008, Asriel composed the song "Metamorphose" that was used for the anime adaptation of Monochrome Factor, song that was released as a maxi single and was their first work produced by a major label, 5pb.

In the same year, Asriel provides music for the visual novel 11eyes, composing the ending theme  for the game. This trend would continue in the year 2009, with the song  used for 11eyes CrossOver and "Sequentia" for the anime adaptation of 11eyes.

On December 30, 2009, Asriel released a new single titled "Devils Lullaby" during Comiket 77 in a specially shaped CD. However, the CD became difficult to sell and had to be recalled. The shape of the CD was changed back to the normal round shape on January 17, and it launched again. Since the special shape CD is no longer in circulation, it is difficult to obtain.

Members
 KOKOMI (born September 2, 1989) - vocals, chorus, and lyric writing.
  - guitar, keyboards, composition, arrangement and lyric writing.

Discography
Source:

Independent

Mini albums

Albums

Singles

Compilations 
 影縫い（CD『Cinderella of magic』 - 廃盤）
 Endless Waltz（CD『POLYCHROMA』 - 廃盤）（CD『POLYCHROMA re-distribution』 - とらのあな・あきばお〜 にて販売）
 Aeon（CD『-LEIRION-』 - 廃盤）
 黒き粉雪の記憶（CD『Winter Mix vol.5』（CD『ALL SEASON MIX BEST』に再録） - とらのあなにて販売）
 蒼月を巡る旋律（CD『Festa!』 - メロンブックス・アニメイト・ゲーマーズ・あきばおー・メッセサンオー・Amazon.co.jpにて販売）
 淡い風に抱かれて（CD『空想RPG！』 - とらのあな・メロンブックス・アニメイト・ゲーマーズ・あきばおー・メッセサンオー・Amazon.co.jpにて販売）
 猩紅のMirage（CD『ALL SEASON MIX BEST』 - とらのあなにて販売）
 翡翠のMoment（CD『SUMMER VACATION』 - メロンブックスにて販売）

Major labels

Singles

Albums

References

External links
 Asriel official website 
 J-Asriel Land

Japanese gothic metal musical groups
Japanese rock music groups